Edward McGovern Tobacco Warehouse is a historic tobacco warehouse located at Lancaster, Lancaster County, Pennsylvania. It was built about 1880, and is a 2 1/2-story, red brick building.  It is six bays by three bays and has a moderate pitched slate covered gable roof with gabled dormers.  Additions were made with the building about 1910 and about 1939.  The building houses the Lancaster Brewing Company restaurant.

It was listed on the National Register of Historic Places in 1990.

References

Industrial buildings and structures on the National Register of Historic Places in Pennsylvania
Industrial buildings completed in 1880
Buildings and structures in Lancaster County, Pennsylvania
Tobacco buildings in the United States
National Register of Historic Places in Lancaster County, Pennsylvania
1880 establishments in Pennsylvania